PT Pelita Air Service, trading as Pelita Air, is a domestic, hybrid-service airline based in Jakarta, Indonesia. Its main operating base is Soekarno Hatta International Airport, and it is headquartered at Pondok Cabe Airport. Pelita Air is listed in category 1 by Indonesian Civil Aviation Authority for airline safety quality.

History

Early years (1963-1970) 
The airline started its history in 1963 when Pertamina established an air transportation service division named Pertamina Air Service to support employee mobility. On January 24, 1970, the division was officially separated into a separate company under the name "PT Pelita Air Service". The company also provides air transportation services for the oil and gas industry in Indonesia on a rental system.

New ventures (1987-2020) 

On November 24, 1987, the company established PT Indopelita Aircraft Services (IAS) to provide maintenance services for rotating components, such as turbines, compressors and pumps, as well as general and field mechanical services. IAS also offers a digital control system to monitor equipment performance. In 2000, this company provided scheduled flight services under the name "Pelita AirVenture". It ceased schedule flights in 2005 citing tough competition in the scheduled aviation sector. In 2016, this company started to provide transportation services fuel oil. In the same year, the company formed an Airport Strategic Business Unit (SBU) in charge of managing Pertamina's airports. In 2019, SBU Airport started managing three airports owned by Pertamina, namely Pondok Cabe Airport, Pinang Kampai Airport, and Warukin Airport. In 2020, the company started to provide general cargo transportation services.

Relaunch as a scheduled airline (2021-present) 
In late 2021, Indonesian media reported that the Indonesian Ministry of State-owned Enterprises (BUMN) had plans to have Pelita Air replace the financially-ailing flag carrier, Garuda Indonesia, citing the latter's high debt. In November 2021, The ministry's plan for the airline to start scheduled flights was followed by an aircraft lease order for several Airbus A320 aircraft, during which time the airline had applied for an air operator's certificate (AOC).

On April 28, 2022, the airline launched operations as a scheduled carrier with a flight from Jakarta to Denpasar. The regular flights to Bali were later followed by flights to Yogyakarta on June 20, 2022 with more routes from Jakarta planned. Upon the launch of regular services, the Minister of State Owned Enterprises, Erick Thohir, stated that Pelita Air will be solely focusing on the domestic market as opposed to flying international routes, referring to the size of the domestic Indonesian aviation market. However, later in 2022, reports emerged of plans for the airline to start Hajj operations to Saudi Arabia in 2023.

Destinations 
As of February 2023, Pelita Air currently serves scheduled flights to 3 Indonesian destinations out of its hub at Soekarno Hatta International Airport:

Fleet

Current fleet

As of February 2023, the Pelita Air fleet consists of the following aircraft:

Historical fleet

The airline's historic fleet includes the following aircraft:

Accidents and incidents
 On 2 January 1990, while on the way to Palembang, a CASA 212 operated by Pelita Air experienced an engine trouble. The aircraft ditched and sank into Java sea. 7 people were killed.

Notes

References

External links 

 

Airlines of Indonesia
Airlines established in 1963
Airlines formerly banned in the European Union
Indonesian companies established in 1963